The Haizhu Island Circular New Tram, Line THZ1, or YoungTram is a tram system mainly serving the Haizhu District of Guangzhou, between  and . It is an at-grade tram system. The whole line (except Party Pier station) began operation on 31 December 2014. Party Pier station was added on 21 October 2015.

The Haizhu Tram is the first of the planned lines operated by Guangzhou Trams to open.

Length and stations
The entire track of the first section of the Haizhu Tram, with a length of 7.7 km and all ten stations are laid at-grade.

See also
Guangzhou Tram

References

Transport in Guangzhou
Railway lines opened in 2014
2014 establishments in China